Shevel (Cyrillic: Шевель) is a surname. Notable people with the surname include:

Andrey Shevel (born 1972), Russian rower
Daniella Shevel, South African and American footwear designer
Georgiy Shevel (1919–1988), Ukrainian politician and diplomat
Yuriy Shevel (born 1988), Ukrainian footballer

See also